Siege of Sevastopol may refer to:

Siege of Sevastopol (1854–1855), during the Crimean War
Siege of Sevastopol (1941–1942), during the Second World War
 Siege of Sevastopol (panorama), a 1904 painted panorama by Franz Roubaud

See also
 Sevastopol (disambiguation)